The 4th Tank Battalion, 1st Division, King's Guard (ม.พัน ๔ พล.๑ รอ.) is an Tank Battalion of the Royal Thai Army, it is currently a part of the 1st Division, King's Guard.

History
4th Tank Battalion, 1st Division, King's Guard was originally founded in 1930 from after a transformation of 2nd Tank Battalion in Saraburi. The first commander is M.L. Tor Panomwan.  Eventually in 1944 the government shutted down 4th Tank Battalion in Karnchanaburi then later transformed 6th Tank Battalion into new 4th Tank Battalion and in 1951 the 4th Battalion was changed again to 7th Battalion.

4th Battalion was re-founded in 1973 into 2nd Tank Battalion with type M24 tanks from U.S. in Phra Nakhon province (Bangkok nowaday). The unit was established again on 1 April 1951. In 1979 the 4th Tank Battalion was appointed as Royal Guard.

Organization

Mission 
 Engage and destroy the enemy
 Using firepower and maneuvers
 Power to terrorize
 Capable of working with other units

Capacity 
 Conducting combat operations using firepower with fluency and brutality
 Ability to strike or counter-strike the enemy
 Ability to destroy enemy's vehicles
 Provide infantry support and Cavalry using destructive strategy
 Fluency in territory control
 Provide unit fire support
 Manage administration, transmission and communication and maintenance within the Battalion
 100% operational

Limitation 
 Only oneself
 height, weight, hearing and sight
 need for heavy maintenance
 Obstructive environment
 terrain and weather
 Natural and man-made Barricades

See also
 1st Division (Thailand)
 2nd Infantry Division (Thailand)
 7th Infantry Division (Thailand)
 9th Infantry Division (Thailand)
 30th Cavalry Squadron, Queen's Guard (Thailand)
 King's Guard (Thailand)
 Royal Thai Army
 Thai Royal Guards parade

References

External links
 https://www.tank1004.com/

Military units and formations established in 1930
King's Guard units of Thailand